8O or 8-O

8O, IATA code for West Coast Air
8º (also 8o), an abbreviation in bookbinding for Octavo
8º, an abbreviation for eighth in some languages
8º TAP Rallye de Portugal; see 1974 Rallye de Portugal
Oxygen (8O), a chemical element

See also
O8 (disambiguation)